Welter is a Germanic surname that may refer to:

Alexandre Welter (born 1953), Brazilian sailor 
Ariadne Welter (1930–1998), Mexican movie actress
Charles Welter (born 1880), Dutch minister
Emmi Welter (1887–1971), German politician
Erich Welter (1900-1982), German journalist
Gabriel Welter (1890–1954), German archaeologist. 
Jean Welter (born 1901), Luxembourgian boxer
Jennifer Welter (born 1977), American football player and coach
Kurt Welter (1916–1949), German fighter ace
Marion Welter (born 1965), Luxembourgian singer
Michel Welter (1859–1924), Luxembourgian politician
Nik Welter (1871–1951), Luxembourgian writer and politician

German-language surnames
Surnames from given names